Normand Morse "Norm, Norman" Shay (February 3, 1899 in Huntsville, Ontario — November 28, 1968) was a Canadian ice hockey player who played two seasons in the National Hockey League for the Boston Bruins and the Toronto St. Pats between 1924 and 1926. The rest of his career, which lasted from 1921 to 1930, was spent in the United States Amateur Hockey Association and minor Canadian–American Hockey League.

Career statistics

Regular season and playoffs

College Head Coaching Record

† Shay was replaced part way through the season.

External links

1899 births
1968 deaths
Boston Bruins players
New Haven Bears players
Ice hockey people from Ontario
New Haven Eagles players
People from Huntsville, Ontario
Philadelphia Arrows players
Toronto St. Pats players
Westminster Hockey Club ice hockey players
Penn Quakers men's ice hockey coaches